Santa claws may refer to: 

 Sanctacaris (informally Santa Claws), a Middle Cambrian Habellid arthropod
 Santa Claws (1996 film), a 1996 slasher film
 Santa Claws, a 2004 novella by American author MaryJanice Davidson
 Santa Claws, a 2014 direct-to-video Christmas film from The Asylum

See also
 Santa Claus (disambiguation)